Patrick Mennucci (born 8 April 1955 in Marseille, Bouches-du-Rhône) is a French politician and a member of the Socialist Party. He had been the MP of the Bouches-du-Rhône's 4th constituency from June 2012 to June 2017, where he was defeated by Jean-Luc Mélenchon of La France insoumise party.

Studies 
Patrick Mennucci studied political sciences at the Institut d'études politiques d'Aix-en-Provence as well as business at the Euromed Management – School of Management and Business.

Political career

References 

1955 births
Living people
Socialist Party (France) politicians
Sciences Po Aix alumni
French people of Italian descent
Politicians from Marseille
Deputies of the 14th National Assembly of the French Fifth Republic